Bernard Cornwell's career started in 1981 with Sharpe's Eagle. He has been a prolific historical novelist since then, having published more than 60 novels.

Novel series

The Sharpe stories

Cornwell's best known books feature the adventures of Richard Sharpe, a British soldier during the Napoleonic Wars.

The first 11 books of the Sharpe series (beginning in chronological order with Sharpe's Rifles and ending with Sharpe's Waterloo, published in the US as Waterloo) detail Sharpe's adventures in various Peninsular War campaigns over the course of 6–7 years. Subsequently, Cornwell wrote a prequel quintet – Sharpe's Tiger, Sharpe's Triumph, Sharpe's Fortress, Sharpe's Trafalgar and Sharpe's Prey – depicting Sharpe's adventures under Wellington's command in India, including his hard-won promotion to the officer corps, his return to Britain and his arrival in the 95th Rifles, and a sequel, Sharpe's Devil, set six years after the end of the wars.

He also wrote Sharpe's Battle, a novel "inserted" into his previous continuity, taking place during the Battle of Fuentes de Oñoro. It has been asserted [unattributed] that Cornwell was initially dubious about the casting of Sean Bean for the television adaptations. However, Cornwell effectively scotches this assertion in an interview with the "CompleatSeanBean" website. Indeed, Cornwell states in the same interview that he "was utterly delighted that it was to be Sean Bean". Cornwell also dedicated Sharpe's Battle to Sean Bean, and has admitted that he subtly changed the writing of the character to align with Bean's portrayal. Since 2003, he has written further "missing adventures" set during the "classic" Peninsular War era.

The following is the correct 'historical' order, although they are all standalone stories:

The Starbuck Chronicles

A tetralogy set during the American Civil War. The title character, Nathaniel Starbuck, is a Northerner who has decided to fight for the South in a Virginian regiment, the Faulconer Legion. The last novel to date in the series has been The Bloody Ground, taking place during the Antietam Campaign. Cornwell has said that he plans to write more Starbuck novels, but has not done so yet. On his website Cornwell has recently stated that he is 'thinking' about Starbuck again.

The Warlord Chronicles

A trilogy depicting Cornwell's historical re-creation of Arthurian Britain. The series posits that Post-Roman Britain was a difficult time for the native Britons, being threatened by invasion from the Anglo-Saxons in the East and raids from the Irish in the West. At the same time, they suffered internal power struggles between their petty kingdoms and friction between the old Druidic religion and newly arrived Christianity.

The Grail Quest novels

A series that deals with a mid-14th century search for the Holy Grail during the Hundred Years' War. An English archer, Thomas of Hookton, becomes drawn into the quest by the actions of a mercenary soldier called "The Harlequin," who murders Thomas's family in his own obsessive search for the Grail. Cornwell was planning at one point to write more books about the main character Thomas of Hookton and said that shortly after finishing Heretic he had "... started another Thomas of Hookton book, then stopped it – mainly because I felt that his story ended in Heretic and I was just trying to get too much from him. Which doesn't mean I won't pick the idea up again sometime in the future."

The Saxon Stories

Cornwell's latest series focuses on the Anglo-Saxon kingdom of Wessex, England during the 9th-century reign of Alfred the Great, his fierce opposition to the Danes and his determination to unite England as one country.

Thrillers
Cornwell's thrillers are modern mysteries, all with sailing themes. He is a traditional sailor and enjoys sailing his Cornish Crabber by the name of Royalist. His thorough knowledge of sailing and popular skills with writing combine in great novels for the nautically obsessed. According to Cornwell's website, there may be no additions to the series: "I enjoyed writing the thrillers, but suspect I am happier writing historical novels. I'm always delighted when people want more of the sailing books, but I'm not planning on writing any more, at least not now – but who knows? perhaps when I retire."

Other standalone novels

Non-fiction
Cornwell published a nonfiction book, Waterloo: The History of Four Days, Three Armies and Three Battles, released in September 2014, timely for the 200th anniversary of that battle.

Waterloo: The History of Four Days, Three Armies and Three Battles September 2014  / 9780007539383 (UK edition) Publisher William Collins

Bibliography

References

External links
 
 Bibliography at Fantastic Fiction

 
Bibliographies by writer
Bibliographies of historical novels
Bibliographies of British writers